Ament may refer to:

 Catkin, a cylindrical flower cluster
 Ament (surname)
 Imentet, an ancient Egyptian funerary goddess

See also
 Amenti